Richard Dennis Lynch (April 29, 1936 – September 24, 2008) was an American professional football player who was a defensive back in the National Football League (NFL) for the Washington Redskins and the New York Giants.  He was a one-time Pro Bowler in 1963, when he led the NFL in interceptions.  He also led the league in interceptions in 1961.

Biography
Lynch was born in Oceanside, New York. He grew up in Bound Brook, New Jersey, and attended Phillipsburg Catholic High School.

Lynch played college football at the University of Notre Dame and is in their Hall of Fame.  While known as a defensive standout as a professional, in 1957 he scored the only touchdown in Notre Dame's 7–0 win over the University of Oklahoma that ended the Sooners' 47-game winning streak.

Lynch worked as a color commentator for the New York Giants' radio broadcasts from 1967 to 2008.  He was paired with several notable play-by-play announcers, including Marty Glickman, Marv Albert, Jim Gordon and Bob Papa.

His son, Richard Lynch (31), was killed in the September 11 terrorist attacks on the World Trade Center in New York City, where he worked on the 84th floor of Two World Trade Center.

Following his death in 2008, he was inducted as one of the New York Giants' Ring of Honor Inductees. The Ring of Honor is awarded to the franchise's greatest and most influential figures.

Death
Lynch died from leukemia on September 24, 2008, aged 72, at his home in Douglaston, Queens. Lynch was married to Rosalie Lynch for over 47 years.  They had six children and eleven grandchildren.

See also

History of the New York Giants (1925–1978)

References

External links
Story about Dick Lynch
Dick Lynch Made the Call
50 Greatest Giants Photo Gallery
Dick Lynch passes away
Obituary in Newsday
Remembering Dick Lynch

1936 births
2008 deaths
American football defensive backs
Eastern Conference Pro Bowl players
National Football League announcers
New York Giants announcers
New York Giants players
Notre Dame Fighting Irish football players
Washington Redskins players
Deaths from leukemia
People from Bound Brook, New Jersey
People from Oceanside, New York
Players of American football from New Jersey
Sportspeople from Somerset County, New Jersey
People from Douglaston–Little Neck, Queens